Blue Mill Stream is a river in Delaware County, New York. It flows through Black Ash Swamp before converging with the Delaware River west-northwest Lordville.

References

Rivers of New York (state)
Rivers of Delaware County, New York